Zabana! is a 2012 Algerian drama film directed by Saïd Ould Khelifa. The film was selected as the Algerian entry for the Best Foreign Language Oscar at the 85th Academy Awards, but it did not make the final shortlist.

Cast
 Khaled Benaïssa
 Imad Benchenni
 Abdelkader Djeriou
 Laurent Gernigon
 Corrado Invernizzi
 Nicolas Pignon

See also
 List of submissions to the 85th Academy Awards for Best Foreign Language Film
 List of Algerian submissions for the Academy Award for Best Foreign Language Film

References

External links
 

2012 films
2012 drama films
2010s Arabic-language films
Algerian drama films